Nicholas Zabriskie "Nick" Scoville is the Francis L. Moseley Professor of Astronomy at Caltech.

Education 
Scoville earned his B.A. and Ph.D. from Columbia University.

Research
Scoville's research interests include interstellar molecular clouds and star formation activity within these clouds, interacting ultraluminous-infrared galaxies and active galactic nuclei. He led the Cosmic Evolution Survey (COSMOS) that is among the best studied fields in extragalactic astronomy and one of the largest galaxy surveys executed by the Hubble Space Telescope.

Scoville's major research investigations include : first mapping of CO emission in the Galactic plane and discovery of the 5 kpc molecular gas ring (with Phil Solomon); first theoretical analysis of line photon trapping in the molecular emission lines (with Solomon); first recognition that the molecular gas cloud were self-gravitating (rather than being galactic spiral arms); theory of mass-loss winds from red giant stars and their molecular emission lines (with Peter Godreich); the UMass-Stonybrook galactic CO survey (with Dave Sanders, Phil Solomon and Dan Clemens), the UMass extragalactic CO survey (with Judy Young and students); High Resolution IR spectroscopy (with Don Hall, Susan Kleinman and Steve Ridgway); observations and theoretical modelling of Ultra Luminous IR galaxies and the evolution of starburst galaxies to quasars (with Dave Sanders, Colin Norman and others); imaging of local ULIRG galaxies and the Galactic Center with the Hubble Space Telescope NICMOS camera (with Roger Thompson, Aaron Evans and Susan Stolovy); founder and leader of the Cosmic Evolution Evolution Survey (COSMOS); and the evolution of interstellar gas and dust in galaxies from z = 0.1 to 5 (with the COSMOS team).

Scoville's main hobby outside astronomy is steel sculptural design and construction and welding. He also works on the Hubble Heritage Project, and the Cosmic Evolution Survey a multi-wavelength deep-field study of galaxies in the early universe.

While at the University of Massachusetts, Scoville was the associate director of Five College Radio Astronomy Observatory. At Caltech he was the director of Owens Valley Radio Observatory from 1986 through 1996

Scoville developed the MIR software package for calibrating data from the OVRO Millimeter Array, which was later used by other astronomical radio interferometers.

The main belt asteroid 25746 Nickscoville is named after Scoville. He was elected as a member of the National Academy in 2022.

In 2021, Scoville was awarded the Henry Norris Russell Lectureship by the American Astronomical Society  "For contributions in understanding molecular gas and star formation and for his work in inspiring generations of early career astronomers".

References

American astronomers
Living people
California Institute of Technology faculty
Year of birth missing (living people)
Columbia Graduate School of Arts and Sciences alumni
Columbia College (New York) alumni